Moussa Bezaz (born 30 December 1957) is a French-Algerian former footballer and football manager. His nephew is the Algerian footballer Yacine Bezzaz.

Career
Born in Algeria, Bezaz spent his whole career in France, playing as a defender for Sochaux, Rennes, Épinal and Chaumont, where he began his coaching career.

He also played several times for the France national youth football team, and therefore never played for Algeria.

Coaching career
Bezaz coached Chaumont, Charleville, Épinal and Nancy in France. He was named Palestine national football team manager in July 2009. He also coached in Bahrain, Lebanon and Algeria.

References

1957 births
Living people
French sportspeople of Algerian descent
French footballers
Algerian footballers
FC Sochaux-Montbéliard players
Stade Rennais F.C. players
SAS Épinal players
Ligue 1 players
Ligue 2 players
Association football defenders
French football managers
Algerian football managers
OFC Charleville managers
AS Nancy Lorraine managers
Palestine national football team managers
US Chaouia managers
SAS Épinal managers